Sines is the fourth studio album by New Zealand post-rock band Jakob. It was released through The Mylene Sheath records on October 21, 2014. The album was recorded at Roundhead Studios and Sister Lung Studios in Auckland and Napier, respectively, mixed by Jeff Boyle and mastered by Chris Chetland. Rhian Sheehan contributed the string arrangements. Single "Blind Them with Science" premiered August 1, 2014.

Reception

Upon release, the album was met with generally favorable reviews. Rod Whitfield of Beat Magazine gave the album a positive review and described the compositions on Sines as "strange and beautiful soundscapes [meant] to enthrall and entrap you" with "much ebb and flow…subtle in its delivery and effect." Whitfield called the use of "real" strings as "dark, melancholic [and beautiful]". He stated that the songs are "long, dense and…quite tough, [but] if you let them into your soul they are truly compelling." Another positive review from Nick Dodds of Echoes and Dust said the album was "magnificent", "glorious" and "wonderful...Forty four odd minutes of sublime beauty". In 2015 the album was awarded the Taite Music Prize.

Track listing

Personnel

Jakob
 Jeff Boyle – guitar, synth, samples
 Maurice Beckett – bass
 Jason Johnston – drums

Production
 Chris Chetland – mastering
 Jeff Boyle – mixing, engineering
 Aaron Harris – mixing
 David Holmes – mixing
 Nick Blow – mixing, engineering
 Jonathan Gardner – engineering
 Troy Kelly – strings engineering (2, 4)

 Rhian Sheehan – strings arrangement (2, 4) 
 Maurice Beckett – photography
 Michael Hawksworth – artwork
 Anthony Flack – layout, design

Additional musicians
 Malcolm Struthers – double bass (2, 4)
 Rowan Prior – cello (2, 4)
 Ben Knapp – piano (2)
 Andrew Thomson – viola (2, 4)
 Anne Loeser – violin (2, 4)
 Jonathan Tanner – violin (2, 4)
 Rebecca Struthers – violin (2, 4)

References 

2014 albums
Jakob (band) albums
Albums recorded at Roundhead Studios